The Eastern Correctional Facility is a state prison for men in Napanoch, Ulster County, New York.  Eastern is one of the oldest prison facilities in the state.  It has been a maximum security prison for men since 1973.

History 

The site opened as the "Eastern New York Reformatory".  Its imposing main building, with medieval-style turrets and long green copper roof, was designed by architect John Rochester Thomas, who had also designed Elmira.  The site was chosen partly for its easily available stone, and the transport provided by the adjacent Delaware and Hudson Canal; able-bodied adult prisoners were imported for construction labor.

In 1906 the adult prisoners were returned, replaced with juvenile offenders, and the reformatory officially began operation.  Years later it achieved its capacity of 500 beds.  In 1921 Eastern became the first of the institutions for defective delinquents in the United States.  At various times the facility was designated as the "Institute for Defective and Delinquent Men at Napanoch", "State Institution for Male Defective Delinquents", and the "Catskill Reformatory".   

The state's Ulster Correctional Facility was built on Eastern's grounds in 1990.

References

External links 
 description of the 1902 Ontario and Western Railway Station and Museum

Prisons in New York (state)
Buildings and structures in Ulster County, New York
1900 establishments in New York (state)